Galactose-3-O-sulfotransferases is a family of several mammalian galactose-3-O-sulfotransferase proteins. Gal-3-O-sulfotransferase is thought to play a critical role in 3'-sulfation of N-acetyllactosamine in both O- and N-glycans.

Human proteins from this family 
GAL3ST1;   GAL3ST2;   GAL3ST3;   GAL3ST4;   GP3ST;

References

EC 2.8.2
Protein domains